Christabel Gurney, OBE is an activist and historian, who was involved in the Anti-Apartheid Movement. She joined the organisation in 1969, and was the editor of its journal Anti-Apartheid News from 1969 to 1980. Later, she was secretary of the Notting Hill Anti-Apartheid Group. She received an OBE "for political service, particularly to Human Rights" in the 2014 Birthday Honours.

Publications
Books

Articles

References

British activists
British women activists
Year of birth missing (living people)
Living people